Matthew Kiichi Heafy (born January 26, 1986) is an American musician, best known as the guitarist and lead vocalist for heavy metal band Trivium. He was also the lead vocalist for the band Capharnaum, along with Trivium's former producer Jason Suecof. In 2017, Heafy was voted sixth on the Ultimate Guitar list "Top 25 Greatest Modern Frontmen".

Early life
Heafy was born in Iwakuni, Japan, to a Japanese mother and an American father. His father, formerly a member of the United States Marine Corps, is half-Irish and half-German. Although Heafy was born in Japan, he only lived there for one year and does not speak Japanese fluently; however, he uses some basic phrases when he performs in Japan. His family then moved to Orlando, Florida, where he currently resides. Heafy attended Lake Brantley High School. He completed his senior year while also touring in Europe and graduated in 2004. During those years, Heafy used to live a straight edge lifestyle.

Heafy learned to play the tenor saxophone in years leading up to becoming more serious on guitar at the age of eleven. At that period he was mostly listening to pop punk bands and even auditioned for a local one called "Freshly Squeezed" by playing the Blink-182 song Dammit. However, following his audition, he never got a follow-up call back. He also cites being introduced to heavy metal by his classmate, David, who gave him a copy of Metallica's self-titled album.

Heafy does not know formal music theory and was almost completely self-taught. He does know how to read sheet music, but can only apply it on the saxophone. However, in 2015, he started taking formal training for the guitar.

"Self-taught for quite a bit of it, did lessons on and off for maybe two or three years, but I do not know anything formal music on guitar. I do on saxophone though…but that doesn't help me on guitar."

Heafy still often uses the same first Gibson Les Paul he got from his father, but only in studio settings. For live performances he uses his signature Epiphone Les Paul that is modeled off of his Gibson.

Career

Following his guitar performance at the school's talent show, Heafy was asked to try out for Trivium by the band's original singer Brad Lewter. Originally, he was accepted as lead guitarist, despite being only 12 years old (other members were 15-16 at that time). Lewter, however, quit the band in less than a month due to creative differences over the band's future musical direction. The drummer Travis Smith persuaded Heafy to do vocals, even though Heafy himself was unsure of his singing voice at that time. The band started looking for an external singer to fill in the position but had trouble finding a suitable candidate. Eventually, Heafy agreed to become a full-time lead singer for Trivium also keeping the position of lead guitarist for the band. He taught himself growling and screaming, especially doing so during the band's early years. However, he admitted using the techniques incorrectly most of his career, which ultimately caused severe damage to his vocal chords in the years leading up to the band's performance at Rock on the Range in 2014, where he blew his voice on stage. That same year, he started taking vocal lessons from coach Ron Anderson, following advice from M. Shadows of Avenged Sevenfold. In 2016, Heafy returned to performing unclean vocals live with the same frequency as he did before his injury, citing Anderson's lessons as a source of help and improvement.  He claims that the new technique is actually easier than normal talking.

With the release of Trivium's fourth album, Shogun, Heafy greatly expanded his vocal range; from very melodic singing to hardcore screams. In 2011, Trivium's fifth studio album, In Waves, was released with a 'greater emphasis on songs rather than skill,' with the album featuring the full range of Heafy's vocal talents with some songs being entirely composed of screaming, others with no screaming at all, and many songs that fused the two as with previous records.

In Trivium, Heafy sometimes shares lead guitar duties with Corey Beaulieu, although he is responsible for recording the rhythm tracks on the albums.

After Ember to Inferno, Heafy jokingly played in the post-hardcore genre, releasing one song titled "Head on Collision with a Rosebush Catching Fire" under the name Tomorrow Is Monday.

On December 4, 2020, Heafy released a collaborative 5-track EP with American YouTuber and musician Jared Dines.

Ibaraki

On January 21, 2022, Heafy unveiled the first single, "Tamashii no Houkai", from his black metal influenced project Ibaraki. The song features Ihsahn of black metal band Emperor.

Ibaraki's debut album, Rashomon, was released on May 6, 2022, which features Nergal of Behemoth and Gerard Way of My Chemical Romance, in addition to Ihsahn. The album's lyrics were inspired by Heafy's Japanese heritage, drawing from Japanese mythology and folklore.

Roadrunner United

In 2005, Roadrunner Records released Roadrunner United: The All-Star Sessions to celebrate the label's 25th anniversary. Four "team captains" were chosen: Joey Jordison (Slipknot, Murderdolls, Scar the Martyr), Robb Flynn (Machine Head), and Dino Cazares (Fear Factory), as well as Heafy. Heafy also wrote the lyrics and sang the lead vocals to "The End," captained by Dino Cazares. He and bandmate/guitarist Corey Beaulieu recorded the song "In the Fire" as well, featuring singer King Diamond, bassist Mike D'Antonio, and drummer Dave Chavarri. He also wrote and played guitar on the tracks "Dawn of a Golden Age", "I Don't Wanna Be (A Superhero)" and "Blood and Flames," also contributing vocals to the latter.

Other appearances
Heafy won the Metal Hammer "Golden God" award in 2006.

The same year, he sang one song, "Blind", for Korn at the Download Festival when Korn's lead vocalist Jonathan Davis fell ill.

Heafy—along with several other metal artists—makes guest appearances in the music videos for "Aesthetics of Hate" by Machine Head, "All I Want" by A Day to Remember, and "Moving On" by Asking Alexandria.

In 2014, Heafy contributed to DragonForce's sixth studio album titled Maximum Overload. He performed backing vocals in three of the album's ten tracks: "The Game", "Defenders" and "No More".

In 2015, Heafy contributed to the metal supergroup album Metal Allegiance. He provided lead vocals and additional guitars on the track "Destination: Nowhere". He also contributed on guitar for the track "Triangulum I. Creation II. Evolution III. Destruction".

In 2016, Heafy appeared on the album Arktis by fellow musician Ihsahn.

In October 2019, Heafy was a featured guest-vocalist on an acoustic version of "Stabbing in the Dark" by Ice Nine Kills.

On December 4, 2020, Heafy appeared on a 5-song collaborative EP with youtuber Jared Dines titled "Dines x Heafy".  The music video for the song "Dear Anxiety" was also release on the same day.  Heafy and Dines had previously collaborated on a cover of "Better Now" by Post Malone.

On July 16, 2021, Heafy provided guest vocals on Powerwolf's re-recording of "Fist by Fist (Sacralize or Strike)" on the deluxe version of Call of the Wild.

Heafy appears as a guest vocalist in Funcom's Metal: Hellsinger. He's acting as composer and sound designer for the upcoming game Martial Arts Tycoon.

Heafy was also included in multiple songs from 2 albums released in 2022 based on the card game Magic:the gathering

Equipment

Guitars

Heafy has been endorsing Gibson since Summer 2009. Prior to that, in 2006, he endorsed Dean after he and Corey Beaulieu were both given Dean Razorback prototypes. In 2008, his signature model, an ML shape with a graphic of the Japanese Rising Sun, was released. He stopped using Deans in 2009 after some disagreements. In summer 2009 Gibson made him a custom 7 string Explorer, which later became a production model but only available in black right-handed models.

In 2013, Epiphone released his artist signature model Les Paul in both 6 and 7 string versions. He had previously been seen playing his signature models on the Dream Theater "A Dramatic Turn of Events Tour". In 2017, Epiphone released a new signature model called "SnØfall", which drew inspiration from Trivium's 2015 album Silence in the Snow. This model is available in 6 and 7 string configurations and features an exclusive custom Alpine White finish along with white Phenolic fret board. In 2022, Epiphone released his signature Les Paul Custom Origins with his signature Fishman Fluence pickups and in black and white, 6 and 7 strings and right and left-handed configurations.

 Epiphone Les Paul Custom Origins Signature black and white 6 and 7 String in left and right handed configuration
 Epiphone Les Paul Custom Signature Model black 6 String and 7 String
 Epiphone Les Paul Custom "Snøfall" Signature Model all white 6 String and 7 String, inspired by Trivium's 2015 album Silence in the Snow
 Gibson Les Paul Custom in black, white and silverburst
 Gibson Explorer 7 string in white and black
 Hummingbird Acoustic when needed 
 Dean ML MKH Rising Sun signature model and various other models
 Dean Razorback

Personal life
On January 10, 2010, Heafy married Ashley Howard in Orlando, Florida. The wedding was attended by their close friends and family. The couple have two twin children: a daughter and a son both born on November 6, 2018. Matt returned home from tour to be with Ashley while she gave birth while the tour finished with Howard Jones and Johannes Eckerström performing guest vocals on various songs and YouTuber Jared Dines filling in on guitar.

Heafy has a younger sister, YouTuber Michelle Heafy.

Twitch streaming
Heafy is a gamer and practitioner of Brazilian jiu-jitsu. He does daily live streams on his Twitch channel "matthewkheafy", which consists of playing video games, running guitar clinics, vocal warm-ups, showcasing his Brazilian jiu-jitsu classes, and playing Trivium songs and acoustic covers.

Discography

With Trivium

 Ember to Inferno (2003)
 Ascendancy (2005)
 The Crusade (2006)
 Shogun (2008)
 In Waves (2011)
 Vengeance Falls (2013)
 Silence in the Snow (2015)
 The Sin and the Sentence (2017)
 What the Dead Men Say (2020)
 In the Court of the Dragon (2021)

With Capharnaum
 Fractured (2004)

Mindscar
 "Midwinter Darkness" demo (2002)

Tomorrow Is Monday
 Lush Like an Antpile (2004)
 "Head on Collision with a Rosebush Catching Fire" (2004)

With Jared Dines
 Dines x Heafy (2020)

With Ibaraki
 Rashomon (2022)

Others
 Roadrunner United (2005)
 "Master of Puppets" (2006)
 Machine Head - "Aesthetics of Hate" (Music video cameo) (2007)
 Maiden Heaven: A Tribute to Iron Maiden (2008)
 A Day to Remember - "All I Want" (Music video cameo) (2011)
 Caliban - "Falling Downwards" (Bonus track) - Ghost Empire (2014) 
 DragonForce - guest vocals on songs "The Game", "No More" and "Defenders" off the album Maximum Overload (2014)
 Upon a Burning Body - guest vocals on "Blood, Sweat and Tears" - The World Is My Enemy Now (2014)
 "The Wretchedness Inside" (2014)
 Asking Alexandria - "Moving On" (Music video cameo) (2014)
 Metal Allegiance - lead vocals and additional guitar on "Destination: Nowhere", additional guitars on "Triangulum I. Creation II. Evolution III. Destruction" (2015)
 Maiden Heaven Volume 2: An All-Star Tribute To Iron Maiden (2016)
 Ihsahn - backing vocals on "Mass Darkness" off the album Arktis (2016)
 Any Given Day - guest vocals on "Arise" off the album Everlasting (2016), also in the music video for the song
 SHVPES - guest vocals on "Rain" off the album Greater Than (2018)
 In Vain - guest vocals on "Soul Adventurer" off the album Currents (2018), also in the music video for the song
 Ice Nine Kills - guest vocals on acoustic version of "Stabbing in the Dark" (2019) (original song from The Silver Scream)
 Jamey Jasta - guest vocals on "When The Contagion Is You" off the album The Lost Chapters Volume 2 (2019)
 CABAL - guest vocals on "Bitter Friend" off the album Drag Me Down (2020)
 Me and that Man - guest vocals on "You Will Be Mine" off the album New Man, New Songs, Same Shit, Vol. 1 (2020)
 Chthonic - guest vocals on "Supreme Pain for the Tyrant-Rearrange 2.0" (2020)
 Bleed from Within - guest guitar on "Night Crossing" off the album Fracture (2020)
 Daniel Tompkins (Tesseract) - guest vocals on "The Gift" off the solo album Ruins (2020)
 Powerwolf - guest vocals on re-recording of "Fist by Fist (Sacralize or Strike)" off the deluxe version of Call of the Wild (2021)
 The Halo Effect - guest vocals on "Last of Our Kind" off the album Days Of The Lost (2022)
 Malevolence - guest guitar on "Salvation" off the album Malicious Intent (2022)

References

External links

 Trivium's official website
 Heafy's blog

Trivium (band) members
1986 births
Living people
American baritones
American heavy metal singers
American heavy metal guitarists
American practitioners of Brazilian jiu-jitsu
Japanese emigrants to the United States
Lake Brantley High School alumni
Rhythm guitarists
Seven-string guitarists
Twitch (service) streamers
Musicians from Orlando, Florida
Musicians from Yamaguchi Prefecture
American musicians of Japanese descent
American people of German descent
American people of Irish descent
Guitarists from Florida
Capharnaum (band) members
American male guitarists
21st-century American guitarists
20th-century American male singers
20th-century American singers
21st-century American male singers
21st-century American singers
Death metal musicians
Black metal singers
American black metal musicians